Pasqua First Nation ( paskwâw) is a Saulteaux-Cree First Nation in southern Saskatchewan, Canada. Their reserves include:
 Last Mountain Lake 80A, shared with 6 other bands
 Pasqua 79
 Treaty Four Reserve Grounds 77, shared with 32 other bands.

History
Chief Paskwa (Pis-qua, brother of Okanes) was a negotiator and signatory to Treaty 4  on 15 September 1874. He created a document of pictographs indicating his understanding of the treaty. His death in 1889 left the First Nation leaderless for 22 years.

References

First Nations in Saskatchewan